is a former Japanese gymnast. He invented and named the skill on Horizontal bar known as the Yamawaki. Yamawaki competed at the 1984 Summer Olympics and won the bronze medal in the team final. He also won a bronze medal in the still rings event at the 1985 world championships

References
databaseOlympics

External links
 Yamawaki(High Bar)

1957 births
Living people
Japanese male artistic gymnasts
Medalists at the World Artistic Gymnastics Championships
Gymnasts at the 1984 Summer Olympics
Olympic gymnasts of Japan
Olympic bronze medalists for Japan
Olympic medalists in gymnastics
Medalists at the 1984 Summer Olympics
Asian Games medalists in gymnastics
Gymnasts at the 1986 Asian Games
Asian Games silver medalists for Japan
Asian Games bronze medalists for Japan
Medalists at the 1986 Asian Games
20th-century Japanese people
21st-century Japanese people